Lontano da dove (Away from where) is a 1983 Italian romantic drama film written and directed by Stefania Casini and Francesca Marciano. For this film Monica Scattini was awarded Nastro d'Argento for best supporting actress.

Plot    
Mario, who has just finished his military service, arrives in New York where Giampaolo, a record friend of his, lives. Mario enthusiastically immerses himself in the life of the city, and frequents a group of Italians that includes Daniela, a receptionist at the headquarters of an Italian newspaper, who however cultivates the dream of becoming an actress and for this reason attends an acting school; Giacomini, a political journalist who, on the other hand, seems more interested in costume; and Desideria, an elusive character who boasts of acquaintances with famous artists and actors.

The path of discovery undertaken by Mario is accompanied by the growing sense of disillusionment suffered by Daniela and Giacomini who, during an excursion to Coney Island, compare New York with Rome and conclude that, in the end, the latter, although provincial and less cosmopolitan, it has its merits. Giacomini then decides to return to Rome, while Daniela plans to reconnect with Andrea, a suitor who lives in Italy.

Cast 
Claudio Amendola as Mario 
Stefania Casini as  Desideria
Victor Cavallo as  Giacomini
Monica Scattini as  Daniela
Michael Wright as  Sylvester
Luisella Boni as  Eleonora Serpieri Altobilli
Franco Schipani as Giampaolo

See also 
 List of Italian films of 1983

References

External links

1983 films
Italian romantic drama films
Films set in New York City
1983 romantic drama films
1983 directorial debut films
1980s Italian-language films
1980s Italian films